2000 presidential election may refer to:

2000 Federal Republic of Yugoslavia presidential election
 2000 Fijian presidential election
 2000 Finnish presidential election
 2000 Ghanaian presidential election
 2000 Mexican general election (includes a presidential election)
 2000 Polish presidential election
 2000 Taiwan (Republic of China) presidential election
 2000 Romanian presidential election
 2000 Russian presidential election
 2000 Senegalese presidential election
 2000 Turkish presidential election 
 2000 United States presidential election
 2000 Uzbekistani presidential election
 2000 Venezuelan presidential election